Sugar Hollow Creek is a tributary of Bowman Creek in Wyoming County, Pennsylvania, in the United States. The creek is not designated as an impaired waterbody. The surficial geology near its mouth consists of alluvium, Wisconsinan Outwash, and Wisconsinan Till. The creek is a High-Quality Coldwater Fishery, a Migratory Fishery, and Class A Wild Trout Waters.

Course

Sugar Hollow Creek begins between Doll Mountain and Forkston Mountain in Mehoopany Township. It flows east-northeast for a short distance before turning east-southeast and entering Eaton Township. After a few tenths of a mile, the creek turns east-northeast again before turning southeast. After several tenths of a mile, it receives an unnamed tributary from the right and as its valley narrows, it heads in an easterly direction for several tenths of a mile before receiving an unnamed tributary from the left. The creek then flows east-southeast for more than a mile until it reaches its confluence with Bowman Creek.

Hydrology
Sugar Hollow Creek is not designated as an impaired waterbody.

Geography and geology
Sugar Hollow Creek flows through a valley known as Sugar Hollow.

Near the mouth of Sugar Hollow Creek, the surficial geology mainly consists of Wisconsinan Outwash, but there is a thin strip of alluvium along the creek itself. Slightly further upstream, some Wisconsinan Till is present.

During the Ice Age, glacial meltwater from the valley of Sugar Hollow Creek helped to create a large delta in the valley of Bowman Creek. This delta has since been divided by stream action. There are two "deeply notched" cols at the headwaters of the creek. There is an abandoned and semi-reclaimed pit at the mouth of the creek's valley.

Watershed
The mouth of the creek is in the United States Geological Survey quadrangle of Tunkhannock. However, its source is in the quadrangle of Meshoppen.

Sugar Hollow Creek is one of several major tributaries to Bowman Creek.

The entire length of Sugar Hollow Creek is on private land. A total of 80 percent is open to access, while the remaining 20 percent is closed to access.

History

Sugar Hollow Creek was entered into the Geographic Names Information System on August 2, 1979. Its identifier in the Geographic Names Information System is 1193493.

In the 19th century, a gristmill was supplied with water from Sugar Hollow Creek by means of a long, wooden conduit.

In 2006, the Northern Tier Regional Planning and Development Commission was given a $200,000 federal grant to remove woody debris from along Sugar Hollow Creek.

Biology
Wild trout naturally reproduce in Sugar Hollow Creek from its headwaters downstream to its mouth. The creek's drainage basin is designated as a High-Quality Coldwater Fishery and a Migratory Fishery. The entire length of the creek is designated by the Pennsylvania Fish and Boat Commission as Class A Wild Trout Waters for rainbow trout. The Pennsylvania Fish and Boat Commission does not stock with hatchery-raised trout in order to avoid disrupting the natural trout populations.

See also
Benson Hollow, next tributary of Bowman Creek going downstream
Marsh Creek (Bowman Creek), next tributary of Bowman Creek going upstream
List of rivers of Pennsylvania
List of tributaries of Bowman Creek

References

Rivers of Wyoming County, Pennsylvania
Tributaries of Bowman Creek
Rivers of Pennsylvania